, occasionally nicknamed  and , is an American-born Japanese female mixed martial artist. She previously fought in the MMA promotion Jewels and now competes for Deep.

Background
Sugiyama has an older brother.

She graduated from the sports faculty of the Tokai University. While in the Tokai University, she was first introduced to the Karate-Do Zendokai association and began studying karate at 18 years old. She got her black belt in Karate in 2009.

Sugiyama participated in the Japan Open 2007 Vale Tudo Real Fighting Karate-do Championship Series, placing second in the general category for women, being defeated by Saori Ishioka. In 2008, she was the winner of the Japan Open 2008 Vale Tudo Real Fighting Karate-do Championship Series 57 kg. She would repeat this feat in 2009.

Shortly before her professional debut in MMA, she had a grappling match and was defeated by Hitomi Sakamoto.

Mixed martial arts career

JEWELS

Making her debut with the Shoot boxing promotion, Sugiyama once again faced Hitomi Sakamoto, who had defeated Sugiyama in a grappling match. This time, Sugiyama defeated Sakamoto by decision.

Sugiyama was announced for Jewels 9th Ring in a shoot boxing match against Mongolian Esui, but she suffered a broken collar bone and a dislocated shoulder during training, which forced her to withdraw from the event.

Esui defeated Sugiyama by TKO (corner stoppage) early in the second round.

However, the event was cancelled after the Tōhoku earthquake and tsunami earlier in the day.

She defeated Yabushita by split decision.

She defeated Tanaka by TKO in the second round.

However, Modafferi suffered a neck injury in training and withdrew from the fight on December 13.

She won the fight by TKO in the first round.

DEEP JEWELS
On , Sugiyama made her Deep debut against Chisa Yonezawa at Deep: Tokyo Impact - Lightweight GP 2013 Semifinal. She defeated Yonezawa by TKO in the first round.

The fight ended in a majority draw after two rounds.

In her third appearance with DEEP, Sugiyama was scheduled to fight Mizuho Sato at Deep-Jewels 3. She beat Sato by a first-round TKO, after the ringside doctor was forced to stop the bout.

Sugiyama was scheduled to fight Takayo Hashi at Deep-Jewels 4 for the inaugural middleweight title. Hashi won the fight by TKO, near the end of the third round.

Sugiyama was scheduled to fight Yurika Nakakura at Deep Jewels 6. She won the fight by unanimous decision.

At Deep - Dream Impact 2014: Omisoka Special, Sugiyama was scheduled to fight the multiple-time World Boxing Council title challenger Emiko Raika in the latter's sophomore MMA appearance. Sugiyama won the fight by technical submission, forcing her opponent's corner to throw in the towel, as Raika refused to tap.

Sugiyama was next scheduled to fight Yukinari Nabekawa at Deep-Jewels 15. She won the fight by split decision.

Sugiyama extended her winning streak to four, after beating Satsuki Kodama by an armbar at Deep Jewels 17.

Shizuka was scheduled to make her RIZIN debut at the Rizin World Grand Prix 2017: 2nd Round event, being scheduled to fight Kana Watanabe. Watanabe won the fight by a unanimous decision.

Returning to DEEP, Sugiyama was scheduled to fight Sachiko Fujimori at Deep Jewels 20. Sugiyama won the fight by unanimous decision.

Sugiyama was scheduled to fight a rematch with Kana Watanabe Rizin - Heisei's Last Yarennoka!. Watanabe convincingly won the rematch, knocking Sugiyama out after just eleven seconds.

In her first fight outside of Japan, Sugiyama was scheduled to fight Chan-Mi Jeon at Double G FC 02. She won the fight by unanimous decision.

Sugiyama once again returned to DEEP, as she was scheduled to fight Asami Nakai at Deep Jewels 25. Sugiyama won the fight by an armbar.

Sugiyama was scheduled to fight Kano Kagaya at Deep-Jewels 29, in Kagaya's sophomore MMA appearance. Kagaya later withdrew due to COVID-19 and was replaced by Mika Arai. She won the fight by a technical submission, due to an armbar.

Sugiyama was scheduled to fight at DEEP's 20th anniversary event, against Aoi Kuriyama. Sugiyama won by a first-round TKO.

Deep-Jewels Flyweight Grand Prix
Sugiyama faced Mikiko Shimizu in the Deep-Jewels Flyweight Grand Prix quarterfinal bout at Deep Jewels 36 on March 12, 2022. She won the bout via split decision.

On May 8, 2022, she was scheduled to face Aoi Kuriyama in the DEEP JEWELS Flyweight Grand Prix semi-final held at Deep Jewels 37. However, Kuriyama missed weight, resulting in Sugiyama receiveing a bye to the final. In the final on the same day, she faced Rin Nakai, losing via armbar at the end of the first round.

Outside mixed martial arts
Sugiyama posed for a photobook published by Kamipro and has also appeared in an Internet TV show called Stickam TV.

Mixed martial arts record

|-
| Loss
| align=center|21–7–1
| Rin Nakai
| Technical Submission (armbar)
| Deep Jewels 37
| 
| align=center|1
| align=center|4:53
| Tokyo, Japan
| 
|-
| Win
| align=center|21–6–1
| Mikiko Shimizu
| Decision (split)
| Deep Jewels 36
| 
| align=center|2
| align=center|5:00
| Tokyo, Japan
| 
|-
| Win
| align=center| 20–6–1
| Aoi Kuriyama
| TKO (punches)
| DEEP 100 Impact - 20th Anniversary
| 
| align=center| 1
| align=center| 2:40
| Tokyo, Japan
| 
|-
|Win
|align=center| 19–6–1
|Mika Arai
|Technical Submission (armbar)
|Deep Jewels 29
|
|align=center|3
|align=center|1:49
|Tokyo, Japan
|
|-
|Win
|align=center| 18–6–1
|Asami Nakai
|Submission (armbar)
|Deep Jewels 25
|
|align=center|2
|align=center|4:04
|Tokyo, Japan
|
|-
|Win
|align=center|17–6–1
|Chan-Mi Jeon
|Decision (unanimous) 
|Double G FC 02: Fight To Prove
|
|align=center|3
|align=center|5:00
|Seoul, South Korea
|
|-
|Loss
|align=center|16–6–1
|Kana Watanabe
|TKO (punch) 
|Rizin - Heisei's Last Yarennoka!
|
|align=center|1
|align=center|0:11
|Saitama, Japan
|
|-
|Win
| align=center| 16–5–1
| Sachiko Fujimori
| Decision (unanimous)
| Deep Jewels 20
| 
| align=center|3
| align=center|5:00
| Tokyo, Japan
|
|-
| Loss
| align=center|15–5–1
| Kana Watanabe
| Decision (unanimous)
| Rizin World Grand Prix 2017: 2nd Round
| 
| align=center| 3
| align=center| 5:00
| Saitama, Japan
|
|-
|Win
| align=center| 15–4–1
| Satsuki Kodama
| Technical Submission (armbar)
| Deep Jewels 17
| 
| align=center|1
| align=center|4:53
| Tokyo, Japan
|
|-
| Win
| align=center| 14–4–1
| Yukinari Nabekawa
| Decision (split)
| Deep-Jewels 15
| 
| align=center| 2
| align=center| 5:00
| Tokyo, Japan
| 
|-
|Win
|align=center| 13–4–1
|Emiko Raika
|Technical Submission (armbar)
|Deep - Dream Impact 2014: Omisoka Special
|
|align=center|1
|align=center|4:06
|Saitama, Japan
|
|-
| Win
| align=center| 12–4–1
| Yurika Nakakura
| Decision (unanimous)
| Deep Jewels 6
| 
| align=center| 2
| align=center| 5:00
| Tokyo, Japan
|
|-
| Loss
| align=center| 11–4–1
| Takayo Hashi
| TKO (punches)
| Deep-Jewels 4
| 
| align=center| 3
| align=center| 4:20
| Tokyo, Japan
| Deep-Jewels Inaugural Bantamweight Championship 
|-
| Win
| align=center| 11–3–1
| Mizuho Sato
| TKO (doctor stoppage)
| Deep-Jewels 3
| 
| align=center| 1
| align=center| 1:15
| Tokyo, Japan
| 
|-
| Draw
| align=center| 10–3–1
| Ji Yeon Kim
| Draw (majority)
| Deep: Cage Impact 2013
| 
| align=center| 2
| align=center| 5:00
| Tokyo, Japan
| 
|-
| Win
| align=center| 10–3 
| Chisa Yonezawa
| TKO (punches)
| Deep: Tokyo Impact - Lightweight GP 2013 Semifinal
| 
| align=center| 1
| align=center| 1:16
| Tokyo, Japan
| 
|-
| Win
| align=center| 9–3 
| Sung Eun Kim
| TKO (punches)
| Jewels 23rd Ring
| 
| align=center| 1
| align=center| 1:01
| Tokyo, Japan
| 
|-
| Win
| align=center| 8–3 
| Yurika Tanaka
| TKO (punches)
| Jewels 21st Ring
| 
| align=center| 2
| align=center| 1:24
| Tokyo, Japan
| 
|-
| Win
| align=center| 7–3 
| Megumi Yabushita
| Decision (split)
| Jewels 20th Ring
| 
| align=center| 2
| align=center| 5:00
| Tokyo, Japan
| 
|-
| Loss
| align=center| 6–3 
| Esui
| TKO (corner stoppage)
| Jewels 11th Ring
| 
| align=center| 2
| align=center| 0:13
| Tokyo, Japan
| 
|-
| Loss
| align=center| 6–2 
| Miki Morifuji
| Decision (unanimous)
| Jewels 7th Ring
| 
| align=center| 2
| align=center| 5:00
| Tokyo, Japan
| 
|-
| Win
| align=center| 6–1 
| Yukiko Ozeki
| Decision (unanimous)
| Jewels 6th Ring
| 
| align=center| 2
| align=center| 5:00
| Tokyo, Japan
| 
|-
| Loss
| align=center| 5–1 
| Alexandra Sanchez
| Decision (unanimous)
| Jewels 5th Ring
| 
| align=center| 2
| align=center| 5:00
| Tokyo, Japan
| 
|-
| Win
| align=center| 5–0 
| Hitomi Sakamoto
| Decision (unanimous)
| Shoot Boxing Girls Tournament 2009
| 
| align=center| 2
| align=center| 5:00
| Tokyo, Japan
| 
|-
| Win
| align=center| 4–0 
| Mika Harigai
| Decision (unanimous)
| Jewels 4th Ring
| 
| align=center| 2
| align=center| 5:00
| Tokyo, Japan
| 
|-
| Win
| align=center| 3–0 
| Celine Haga
| Decision (unanimous)
| Jewels 3rd Ring
| 
| align=center| 2
| align=center| 5:00
| Tokyo, Japan
| 
|-
| Win
| align=center| 2–0 
| Shiho
| TKO (knees to the body and punches)
| Jewels 2nd Ring
| 
| align=center| 1
| align=center| 2:55
| Tokyo, Japan
| 
|-
| Win
| align=center| 1–0 
| Harumi
| Submission (rear-naked choke)
| Jewels 1st Ring
| 
| align=center| 1
| align=center| 2:55
| Tokyo, Japan
|

Submission grappling

Legend:

Championships and accomplishments
 Japan Open 2007 Vale Tudo Real Fighting Karate-do Championship Series general category women runner-up
 Japan Open 2008 Vale Tudo Real Fighting Karate-do Championship Series 57 kg winner
 Japan Open 2009 Vale Tudo Real Fighting Karate-do Championship Series 57 kg winner

See also
 List of female mixed martial artists

References

External links
 Shizuka Sugiyama Awakening Profile

Profile at Fightergirls.com
Profile at Jewels 
Profile at Zendokai Yokohama 
Official blog 
Official blog at kakutoh.com 
 

1987 births
Living people
Tokai University alumni
Japanese female karateka
Bantamweight mixed martial artists
Japanese female mixed martial artists
American female mixed martial artists
Mixed martial artists from New York (state)
Mixed martial artists utilizing karate
Sportspeople from New York City
American female karateka
21st-century American women